The Holikachuk are an Alaskan Native people. Holikachuk may also refer to:

Holikachuk language, their language
Holikachuk, Alaska, an abandoned village